Hans Gerhard Colbjørnsen Meldahl (5 October 1815 – 25 December 1877) was a Norwegian jurist and politician.

He was elected to the Norwegian Parliament in 1854 and 1857, representing the constituency of Trondhjem og Levanger. He was Minister of Justice and the Police from 17 December 1861 to 8 January 1874, except for the periods October 1863 to September 1864, October 1866 to October 1867, June 1869 to July 1870 and October 1871 to September 1872 when he was assigned as a member of the Council of State Division in Stockholm.

Outside politics he was a jurist and had graduated as cand.jur. in 1837. In 1854 he was a stipendiary magistrate (byfoged) of Trondhjem; in 1857 he had been appointed Supreme Court judge. He served as the sixth Chief Justice of the Supreme Court of Norway from 1874 to 1877.

References

1815 births
1877 deaths
Members of the Storting
Politicians from Trondheim
Government ministers of Norway
Chief justices of Norway
Ministers of Justice of Norway